Karpero is a village and a community of the Deskati municipality. Before the 2011 local government reform it was part of the municipality of Chasia, of which it was a municipal district. The 2011 census recorded 556 inhabitants in the village and 913 inhabitants in the community. The community of Karpero covers an area of 78.072 km2.

Administrative division
The community of Karpero consists of two separate settlements: 
Dimitra (population 357)
Karpero (population 556)
The aforementioned population figures are as of 2011.

See also
 List of settlements in the Grevena regional unit

References

Populated places in Grevena (regional unit)